Lucien Karier (born 7 July 1933) is a Luxembourgian footballer. He played in two matches for the Luxembourg national football team in 1954. He was also part of Luxembourg's team for their qualification matches for the 1954 FIFA World Cup.

References

External links
 

1933 births
Living people
Luxembourgian footballers
Luxembourg international footballers
Place of birth missing (living people)
Association footballers not categorized by position